Yagan Square is a public space and a component of the Perth City Link in Perth, Western Australia. It is situated between the Horseshoe Bridge and the Perth Busport in the eastern part of the Perth City Link precinct, occupying . Construction of the square began in February 2016, and it was opened on 3 March 2018. It is named after the Aboriginal warrior Yagan.

Overview

The design of Yagan Square has taken into account its place of significance to the indigenous people on whose land it is being built, the Noongar people of Perth, as well as the lakes that used to exist under what is now the Perth railway station and Wellington Street. The square has pedestrian access points from Roe Street in the north, Karak Walk and the Busport to the west, Wellington Street to the south and from the Horseshoe Bridge to the east, with direct access from Perth railway station to Yagan Square under the Horseshoe Bridge in the south-east of the precinct.

Fourteen columns rising from the middle of the tower represent the fourteen Noongar language groups. The tower has been used to display artwork and short films, as well as livestreamed events such as the AFL Grand Final and other sporting events, and a satellite launch in 2021. After the abduction of Cleo Smith in October 2021, images of the missing child were displayed on the tower as part of the public appeal for information.

"Waterline", a  water feature designed by artist Jon Tarry, flows through the space, and Yagan Square also boasts a small grassed area and wildflower garden.

Taking up the eastern half of Yagan Square is an amphitheatre shaded by a light-up digital canopy in the shape of the former Lakes Kingsford and Irwin that once existed in the area. This space is flanked to the north and south by the Horseshoe Lane and Market Hall buildings containing food and beverage outlets, with the larger Market Hall also featuring a children's playground and water play area on its upper level. Although the  building has been praised for its architectural design, after opening the Market Hall saw a gradual exodus of tenants due to lower than expected visitor numbers caused by the building's indirect pedestrian access and mediocre visibility for the businesses inside, with some branding the Market Hall a "ghost town" and a "white elephant". Acknowledging the failure of the initial configuration of the Market Hall, the state government considered reconfiguring the space for other uses such as a farmer's market, before announcing in October 2022 that the Market Hall will undergo a $8.4 million redevelopment into a five-level hospitality complex consisting of a number of restaurants, bars and a beer hall.

Edith Cowan University will build a multi-storey campus, ECU City, to the immediate west of Yagan Square. Construction commenced in February 2023, with completion expected in late 2025 for classes to begin in 2026.

References

External links
 Yagan Square at the DevelopmentWA website
 

Perth City Link
Squares in Perth, Western Australia